Frank Jackett (5 July 1927 – 14 April 2010) was a Welsh professional footballer who played as a wing half.

Career
Jackett moved from Pontardawe Athletic to Watford, making 14 appearances in the English Football League for them between 1949 and 1953. He then spent a season at Leyton Orient, making a further 4 league appearances, before moving into non-league football with Ramsgate.

Personal life
Jackett died on 14 April 2010, at the age of 82. He was the father of Kenny Jackett, also a professional footballer.

References

1927 births
2010 deaths
Welsh footballers
Pontardawe Town F.C. players
Watford F.C. players
Leyton Orient F.C. players
Ramsgate F.C. players
English Football League players
Association football wing halves